Gary H. Gibbons is an American cardiologist and the current director of the National Heart, Lung, and Blood Institute.

Early life and education
Gibbons was born in Philadelphia, Pennsylvania, the youngest of three children born to schoolteacher parents. He grew up in the Philadelphia neighborhood of Germantown. He has credited his mother for inspiring him to be committed to public health. He received his undergraduate degree from Princeton University in 1978 and later graduated from Harvard Medical School. He then completed his residency and cardiology fellowship at Brigham and Women's Hospital.

Career
Gibbons served on the faculty of Stanford University from 1990 to 1996, and on the faculty of Harvard Medical School from 1996 to 1999. In 1999, he joined the Morehouse School of Medicine, where he founded the Cardiovascular Research Institute, which is known for its research on the cardiovascular health of minorities. He then served as its director until August 13, 2012, when he became the director of the National Heart, Lung, and Blood Institute.

Honors and awards
In 2007, Gibbons was named a member of the Institute of Medicine.

References

American cardiologists
Living people
Physicians from Philadelphia
Princeton University alumni
Harvard Medical School alumni
National Institutes of Health people
Stanford University faculty
Harvard Medical School faculty
Members of the National Academy of Medicine
Year of birth missing (living people)